O Malho (Portuguese: The Mallet) was a Brazilian weekly satirical magazine published from 1902 to 1954. It was based in Rio de Janeiro, Brazil. It was the first commercially successful Brazilian satirical magazine during the Republican regime.

History and profile
O Malho was established in 1902 and the first issue was published on 20 September 1902. Its founders were Luis Bartholomeu Antonio Agnello de Souza e Silva, a member of the Brazilian Parliament and Antonio Azeredo, a senator. The magazine was headquartered in Rio de Janeiro and was published on a weekly basis. Although the magazine targeted men and women from different social classes, it basically targeted the working-class readers. During the initial years French artist Crispino do Amaral was the main caricaturist of the magazine. Antonio Leal served as the photographer of the magazine. The publisher of the magazine, O Malho Group, also published a children's and comics magazine, O Tico Tico.

O Malho was the first Brazilian magazine with color pages. The magazine focused on humor and political satire. It contained caricatures and other satirical materials. The magazine also featured musical scores by composers, poems and chronicles. From its start in 1902 to 1926 the magazine regularly featured piano music-related articles in two pages. The work by Elda Coelho on music was covered in the magazine.

Sabino Barroso, president of the Chamber of Deputies, resigned from office due to satirical publications about him in the magazine. In March 1906 O Malho sold 40,000 copies. It folded in January 1954.

References

External links

O Malho in the Digital Collections of the Ibero-American Institute

1902 establishments in Brazil
1954 disestablishments in Brazil
Brazilian political satire
Defunct magazines published in Brazil
Magazines established in 1902
Magazines disestablished in 1954
Magazines published in Brazil
Mass media in Rio de Janeiro (city)
Portuguese-language magazines
Satirical magazines
Weekly magazines published in Brazil